Debabrata Roy (born 4 November 1986) is an Indian football player. He is currently playing for FC Goa in the I-League as a right back.

Career
Roy started his career playing in the Subroto Cup and the under-16 league in West Bengal for Sporting Union Club. His prodigious talent prompted his coaches to despatch him to the prestigious Tata Football Academy in 2000. His first taste of NFL/I-League action came while playing for Mahindra United in 2004-05 where the jeepmen finished a creditable fourth.

In 2005-06, he transferred home to East Bengal F.C. for whom he played for three years before joining United S.C. on a three-month loan spell in 2009. In 2009-10, he returned to Mahindra United who seemed destined for I-League glory till Dempo spoiled their party. After the Mumbai outfit disbanded, he joined Dempo S.C. in 2010-11 and continues to serve them with distinction. He has represented India at all levels right from the age groups teams to the senior team in a host of tournaments.

Honours

India U20
 South Asian Games Silver medal: 2004

References

External links
 Goal.com profile.

Indian footballers
Footballers from Kolkata
1986 births
Living people
India international footballers
India youth international footballers
I-League players
Indian Super League players
Mahindra United FC players
East Bengal Club players
Dempo SC players
FC Goa players
Association football defenders
Footballers at the 2006 Asian Games
Asian Games competitors for India
South Asian Games silver medalists for India
South Asian Games medalists in football